Henry Collins (born 1 September 1977 in Gayndah, Queensland) is a former indigenous light welterweight boxer from Australia, who represented his native country at the 2000 Summer Olympics. Winning the Arthur Tunstall Trophy at the 1999 Australian National Championships is considered to be his best performance during his amateur career, in which he also claimed two Oceania Championships (1999 and 2000) in the 65 kg division.

He was an Australian Institute of Sport scholarship holder.

References

 Profile

1977 births
Living people
Boxers at the 2000 Summer Olympics
Olympic boxers of Australia
People from Wide Bay–Burnett
Australian Institute of Sport boxers
Indigenous Australian Olympians
Indigenous Australian boxers
Australian male boxers
Light-welterweight boxers